Niggaz is an altered form of niggas, a plural form of the English vulgar word nigga, used in African-American vernacular English.

It also may refer to:

 Niggaz on tha Run, a 1990s Gangsta rap group from Compton, California
 Niggaz wit Attitudes, commonly known as N.W.A, an American hip-hop group formed in 1986
 Strictly 4 My N.I.G.G.A.Z..., a 1993 album by Tupac Shakur
 West Side Niggaz, an armed group in Sierra Leone during the civil war there

See also
 Nigaz, petroleum joint venture of Russian majority state-owned energy company Gazprom and Nigerian National Petroleum Corporation